Jesse Lewisohn (8 July 1871 – 30 November 1918), was a businessman involved in copper trading with Lewisohn Brothers, and an owner of racehorses.

Biography
He was born in 1872 to Leonard Lewisohn and he had the following siblings: Walter Lewisohn, Frederick Lewisohn, Oscar Lewisohn (1884–1917), Lillie A. Lewisohn, Alice Lewisohn, and Irene Lewisohn. In 1908 he was in a car with Lillian Russell and the car hit Sylvester T. Corning, the subsequent court case was settled by the New York Supreme Court. His father is of Jewish background.

He married Edna McCauley in Atlantic City, New Jersey. She had been a friend and companion of millionaire Diamond Jim Brady.

He died during the Spanish influenza outbreak on November 30, 1918.

References

1871 births
1918 deaths
American mining businesspeople
American people of German-Jewish descent
Jewish American philanthropists
Deaths from Spanish flu
Lewisohn family
19th-century American philanthropists
19th-century American businesspeople